Madun is an Indonesian soap opera musical comedy drama produced by Amanah Surga Productions that airs daily on SCTV. The story is a loose adaptation of the Tendangan Si Madun story MNCTV.

Synopsis 
Madun series tells the journey of life Madun (16 years) in the fight for ideals his to become a footballer. His father, Syafei (50 years) offspring The terrain is very wanted his son to become a clerics or religious teacher.

Therefore, Syafei always hinder efforts Madun reach his goals were. For him, Madun choice for only one, namely the so a religious expert. Madun his mother, namely Kirana original Batavia awry.
Single he must obey the husband anti ball. But on
the other hand he too did not want to deter Madun realize his ideals. He did not have the heart curb Madun who loved ball. But for realize dream, Madun face a lot of competition.

Cast 
 Yusuf Mahardika as Madun
 Baron Yusuf Siregar as Martin
 Ajil Ditto as Ajil
 Tissa Biani as Maryam
 Adinda Azani as Fatimah
 Gritte Agatha as Anisa Ayunda
 Vinessa Inez as Ayunda
 Arief Fadhillah as Arief
 Cicio Manasero as Ciccio
 Marissa Christina as Marissa
 Cassandra Lee as Rain
 Randy Martin as Fahri
 Mpok Atiek as Atik
 Udin Nga Nga 
 Asrul Dahlan as Syafe'i
 Savira as Kirana
 Ucup Nirin as Ocit
 Mikaila Patriz
 Claudio
 Ibnu Rahim
 Sehan Zack
 Edo Kondologit
 Debbi Shinta
 Rizal Pamungkas

External links 
 
  Synopsis Madun at Website channel SCTV

2015 Indonesian television series debuts
2015 Indonesian television series endings
Indonesian drama television series
Indonesian television soap operas
Indonesian comedy television series
Musical television soap operas
2010s Indonesian television series
2010s television soap operas
SCTV (TV network) original programming